Heligholmen is an island off the south coast of Vamlingbo, Gotland, Sweden, with an area of . It is uninhabited and its only building is a small lighthouse. Heligholmen is a bird reserve. In 1741, Carl Linnaeus, visited the island and described it in his book Öländska och Gothländska Resa.

References

Gotland
Swedish islands in the Baltic
Islands of Gotland County